Anytown, USA or Anytown may refer to:

 Anytown, USA, one of the many placeholder names used in the American vernacular
 Anytown (film), a 2009 drama film
 Anytown, USA (film), a 2005 documentary
 Anytown Camp, run by the National Conference for Community and Justice and their local regions